Clan MacDonald of Keppoch, also known as Clan MacDonell of Keppoch or Clan Ranald of Lochaber, is a Highland Scottish clan and a branch of Clan Donald. The progenitor of the clan is Alistair Carrach MacDonald, 4th great-grandson of the warrior Somerled. The clan chief is traditionally designated as the "Son of Ranald's son" (Scottish Gaelic: Mac Mhic Raonuill).

The clan was known for their reputation for lawlessness, frequent cattle raids, and territory conflicts from neighboring clans in the 16th and 17th centuries, particularly from their rivals, Clan Mackintosh. The MacDonalds of Keppoch supported the Jacobite cause for the House of Stuart in the 17th and 18th centuries, playing a prominent and significant role during the Jacobite uprisings of 1689, 1715, and later during the infamous Jacobite Uprising of 1745. Clan MacDonald of Keppoch has a chief that is recognized by the Court of the Lord Lyon, and the Lord Lyon King of Arms, who is the heraldic authority in Scotland.

History of the MacDonalds of Keppoch

Origins
Further information: Clan Donald and Lord of the Isles

The MacDonalds of Keppoch are one of the branch clans of Clan Donald—one of the largest Scottish clans. The eponymous ancestor of Clan Donald is Donald, son of Reginald, son of Somerled. Somerled, son of Gillebride was a 12th-century Norse–Gaelic leader and warrior who fancied himself as "King of the Isles" and "King of Argyll". Through marital alliance and ambitious military conquest, Somerled rose in prominence to create the Kingdom of Mann and the Isles. Traditional genealogies suggest Somerled is a descendent of various Irish legendary figures. Historians and scholars, however, are skeptical and dubious of Somerled's genealogical royal origins, nor the credibility of Somerled's eventual rise to power.

Lochaber was one of the many territories that Robert the Bruce gifted to his friend, Aonghus Óg of Islay, who fought alongside Bruce during the First War of Scottish Independence, including the successful Battle of Bannockburn in 1314. Aonghus Óg's loyalty to Bruce's claim for the Scottish crown and military services would signify a lasting legacy, in which his own clan became Lords of the Isles.

The MacDonalds of Keppoch are descended from Alistair Carrach MacDonald who was a younger son of Good John of Islay, Lord of the Isles, 6th chief of Clan Donald and his second wife Margaret Stewart, daughter of King Robert II of Scotland. John of Islay, Lord of the Isles, apportioned his estates between the children of his two marriages in accordance with the marriage settlement of his father-in-law Robert II of Scotland and the Lordship of Lochaber was given to Alistair Carrach MacDonald who was the third and youngest son from his second marriage. Alistair Carrach MacDonald was the first MacDonald of Keppoch and Garragach. The MacDonalds of Keppoch occupied the Keppoch and Lochaber territories between Loch Linnhe and Loch Leven and the mountains of Glen Roy and Glen Spean, which are located in Inverness-shire near Spean Bridge.

15th century 
Alistair Carrach MacDonald of Keppoch took an active part in supporting his brother, Domhnall of Islay, Lord of the Isles, in claiming the Earldom of Ross. The result was that upon the death of Domhnall, Lord of the Isles in 1425 the Lordship of Lochaber was forfeited to the Crown and then the Crown bestowed it on the natural son of Stewart, Earl of Mar. This grant was later canceled but the Lordship of Lochaber did not revert to Alistair Carrach MacDonald but instead was given to the Lord of the Isles who subsequently granted the lands of Lochaber to the chief of Clan Mackintosh and this was confirmed by the Crown. However, the superiority remained with the Lord of the Isles, who restored it to Alistair Carrach MacDonald of Keppoch. However, the Crown never confirmed this arrangement, and upon the forfeiture of the Lord of the Isles in 1493, Angus MacDonald, 2nd of Keppoch had to maintain his position in Lochaber by force. It was defended for two and a half centuries and it was not until the downfall of the clan immediately after the Battle of Culloden in 1746 that Mackintosh become the Lords of Lochaber.

In 1480 or 1483, The third chief, Donald Angusson MacDonald, 3rd Laird of Keppoch led the MacDonalds of Keppoch to fight alongside Aonghas Óg MacDonald against his father, John of Islay, Earl of Ross at the Battle of Bloody Bay, after which, Aonhgas Óg emerged victorious. However, the Lordship of the Isles was forfeited in 1493. Donald Angusson of Keppoch, paid tribute to James IV of Scotland at Mingary Castle. Nevertheless, Donald continued to defy the royal Scottish crown and in 1497, his title and lands were forfeited. Donald was issued a royal summons, but never appeared — Donald Angusson MacDonald would be killed fighting the Stewarts of Appin. Donald's son, Liin Aluinn, succeeded him as 4th of Keppoch for only a short time. At the outset, he infuriated his retainers by handing over to Mackintosh a notorious thief known as Domhnull Ruadh Beag, against whom the Clan Chattan had filed a complaint for various depredations. It appears that Donald was given up to Mackintosh on the condition that "his blood not be spilled," a condition that Mackintosh fulfilled to the letter by hanging the thief. The men of the Brae were furious at Iain Aluinn's behavior in yielding to Mackintosh and acknowledging his authority in Lochaber.
Iain's character was undoubtedly well-known before this incident triggered a crisis. He had surrendered a thief to the Macintoshes, who were considered blood enemies of the MacDonalds. The clan next elected the grandson of Alistair Carrach, Alexander who was soon killed in an ambush. His son, Donald Glass, fared better and built the original Castle Keppoch in Lochaber.

In 1497 or possibly 1498, Clan MacDonald of Keppoch defeated the Clan Stewart of Appin and the Clan MacLaren at the Battle of Black Mount in which both the chiefs of Appin and Keppoch were killed.

16th century 
The next chief, Ranald Mor, 7th chief of Keppoch, was a principal supporter of John Moidartach, 8th of Clanranald, who raised the Clan Ranald of Garmoran in rebellion against his kinsman Ranald Gallda Macdonald of Clanranald in the struggle for the chiefship of Clan Ranald. He was also present at the Battle of the Shirts, supporting John Moidartach and the MacDonalds of Clanranald and Clan Cameron against Clan Fraser of Lovat. It is said that only eight MacDonalds and five Frasers survived the battle. Enraged at the death of Lovat, the Earl of Huntly invaded Lochaber and pillaged the lands of Keppoch and Lochiel but failed to capture Ranald Mor or Lochiel. In 1547, William MacIntosh of Macntosh, Captain of Clan Chattan had Keppoch, Lochiel and a number of their followers apprehended and handed them over to Huntly who imprisoned them in Huntingtower Castle in Badenoch. Ranald Mor and Ewen Allanson of Lochiel were tried and imprisoned at Elgin, Moray for the slaughter of Hugh Fraser, 3rd Lord Lovat and eventually executed in 1547 for their part in the murder of Lord Lovat. It was said that Keppoch's wife,  who was a sister of  Mackintosh, implored a prayer of vengeance upon her brother, and prayed that "for many generations to come a son should not succeed his father in the succession of the Mackintosh Chiefs".

After Ranald Mor's death, future Keppoch chiefs were styled as "MacRanald" and the Keppoch clan soon became known as the Clanranald of Lochaber. Also from Ranald Mor, the line of chiefs would eventually adopt their later patronymic of the Gaelic "Mac Mhic Raonuill", which was anglicized as "son of Ranald's son". Thus, creating a traditional designation for future chiefs of Clan Keppoch.

17th century 
The 8th chief, Alexander nan Cleas of Keppoch, was reputed to be a sorcerer, which led to him be given the nickname, “Nan cleas”, meaning “the tricky”. Weather sources say that this claim was true or not, Alexander was guilty of many serious crimes including “slaughters” and “burnings”. He was granted a remission in 1608, but he was eventually forced to flee Scotland to Spain after he helped Sir James MacDonald, 9th of Dunnyveg escape from Edinburg Castle. He only returned after he offered James VI secret information on an impending Spanish invasion. Alexander was even granted a pension and lived out the rest of his days in peace.

Ronald was succeeded by his son, Alexander, known as "Alastair Boloyne," who died only a few months after taking over the throne. Alexander's accession to the chiefship was celebrated with a "heirship." This, no doubt, was a creach made in accordance with the old custom to demonstrate the worthiness of his rank. Alexander of Keppoch, accompanied by Alastair M'Gorrie, John MacInnes, and their followers, invaded, in turn, the fertile plains of Urquhart, Glen Shee, and Strathardle, leaving nothing behind that he could carry with him. Sometime later, he and his associates were granted a reprieve, under the Privy Seal, to endure for 21 years. Alexander appears to have had a tumultuous relationship with his Cameron neighbors. Their disagreements were at length put to the test in a clan battle at Boloinne, in which the Camerons were defeated despite fighting with equal bravery on both sides. The Camerons' leader was killed, and Alexander of Keppoch was severely wounded. Alexander's brother, John Dubh of Bohuntin, took Alexander's place as leader of the men of Keppoch and pursued the retreating Camerons, whom he drove across Loch Lochy into their own country. The engagement between the Macdonalds of Keppoch and the Camerons is mentioned in the "Chronicle of Fortingall," where it is mentioned in an entry in February 1554. Continuing to suffer from his wound, Alexander of Keppoch was forced to consult a well-known herbalist at Kingussie, who, applying his remedy, knowingly poisoned the wound, from the effects of which Alexander died. Alastair Boloyne, as he was later known for his part in the battle of Boloinne, died shortly after that engagement during a clan raid against the Clan Cameron, and was succeeded by his brother, Ranald Og.

Ranald Og succeeded his brother as chief of Keppoch. Ranald Og of Keppoch appears to have distinguished himself above all his predecessors for his loyalty to the Scottish throne and friendly relations with the Campbells. Ranald Og was an exception for his loyalty to the crown and to the regent Moray. In 1563, he made a contract with Colin Campbell of Glenorchy, under which Campbell agreed to set aside the twenty-pound lauds of Rannoch to Keppoch and was a supporter of Charles I of England in the English Civil War. This led to a personal feud with the Earl of Argyll, a stout Presbyterian, who invaded Lochaber and razed Castle Keppoch. Over the next few years, Ranald's younger brother, Donald Glass took revenge by plundering Argyll with the forces of the Marquess of Montrose.

Alexander MacDonald, 12th of Keppoch, along with his brother was slain in 1663 in what is known as the Keppoch murders. The heads of the seven murderers were washed at Tobair-nan-ceann (Scottish Gaelic for the "Well of Heads"), before presentation to the Lord MacDonell of Invergarry.

Noted in the Black-book of Taymouth that in 1681 a bond of manrent was given by Gilleasba, chief of Keppoch, to John Glas, first Earl of Breadalbane; "such as Ceppoch's predecessors gave to the Earl's predecessors." binding Keppoch "to restrain all the inhabitants of Brae-Lochaber, and all of the name of Macdonell, from committing robberies within the Earl's bounds."

The 16th chief, Coll MacDonald, 16th of Keppoch inherited the legacy of clan politics upon his father's death. The death of his father forced him to travel north, and while in Inverness, he sent messengers to Mackintosh, offering to settle their differences through litigation or "amicable settlement". Mackintosh responded to this very reasonable and just request by committing the young Chief as a prisoner to the Tolbooth of Inverness, without even the pretense of a trial. Coll was eventually released in 1683, which only escalated the young chief's personal grudges and vengeance against the Mackintoshes, "Coll had neither forgotten nor forgiven his imprisonment in Inverness in 1683, and the hatred towards Mackintosh which he had been nursing ever since will find an utterance by and by."

In 1688, the Mackintoshes, supported by Clan Chattan and the government of James II of England, made one final attempt to take Lochaber from the MacDonalds of Keppoch. This resulted in the Battle of Mulroy — considered the last private battle between Highland clans. The young 16th chief of Keppoch, led his men against a force of 1,000 men led by Kenneth Mackenzie of Suddie. Although the clan was outnumbered, the MacDonalds of Keppoch won the battle and MacKenzie of Suddie was killed. Coll went on to raid the Mackintosh lands. Later, Coll's clansmen joined the Jacobite cause and fought for Viscount Dundee.

Jacobite Uprising of 1689 
During the Jacobite rising of 1689, the MacDonalds of Keppoch laid siege to the town of Inverness. Shortly afterwards, the MacDonalds of Keppoch fought at the Battle of Killiecrankie, in which the Jacobites won victoriously.

18th century

Jacobite Uprising of 1715 
During the Jacobite rising of 1715, Clan MacDonald of Keppoch were indirectly involved in the siege of Inverness (1715). General Wade's report on the Highlands in 1724, estimated the clan strength at 220 men.  Coll MacDonald and his clansmen would eventually fight for the Jacobites at the Battle of Sheriffmuir. After the Jacobite Rising of 1715 failed, Coll MacDonald suffered exile in France for a time, but retained his power after the Rising, eventually dying in 1729.

Jacobite Uprising of 1745 
During the Jacobite rising of 1745, the Chief, Alexander Macdonald, 17th of Keppoch, was among the men who attacked British Government soldiers who were preparing a surprise assault on the Glenfinnan gathering at what is now known as the Highbridge Skirmish. This was the first strike on the government during the 1745 rising. The MacDonalds of Keppoch were also involved in the siege of Fort William in March 1746. Alexander, 17th Chief of Keppoch, was later killed in action during the Battle of Culloden in 1746.

Among the Keppoch Jacobites to suffer the supreme penalty after the defeat of the Uprising was Major Donald MacDonald, the Tacksman of Tir na Dis near Spean Bridge, who was executed at Carlisle in October 1746. Before his death, however, the Major stated, "I die a member of the Holy Roman Catholic Church in the Communion of which I have lived... And I here declare, upon the faith of a dying man, that it was with no view to establishing that church or religion in this nation that I joined the Prince, but purely out of duty and allegiance to our only rightful, lawful, and native sovereign, due to him had he been a heathen, Mahomedan, or even a Quaker."

Alexander was succeeded by his son, Ranald, the 18th Chief, followed by his son, Richard, 19th Chief. The chiefship would become dormant in 1848 with the death of Chichester, the 21st Chief.

19th century to present 
John de Lotbinière MacDonald (c. 1857 – 1935), paternal grandson of John MacDonald of Garth was the 21st clan chief. Maternally, his grandfather was Robert Unwin Harwood, and Michel-Eustache-Gaspard-Alain Chartier de Lotbinière was his great-grandfather. Shortly afterwards, there was little to no record of the clan, as the succession ended when the original line of Coll MacDonald, 16th of Keppoch ended upon the death of the 21st chief, John de Lotbinière. Thus, the clan was without a chief for the next couple of generations.

The next chief wasn't acknowledged until 13 September 2006 when Ranald Alasdair MacDonald of Keppoch was acknowledged as the lawful chief by the Lyon Court, following a 30-year fight for the right to use the ancient title of Mac Mhic Raonuill. His descent from Donald Gorm, younger brother of Archibald 15th Chief (c. 1680) was accepted by the Court.

List of clan chiefs 
The following is a list of the historic chiefs of the Clan MacDonald of Keppoch:

 Alexander Alisdair Carrach MacDonald, 1st of Keppoch (1369-1440)
 Angus Aonghas na Fearste MacDonald, 2nd of Keppoch (1390-1484)
 Donald MacDonald, 3rd of Keppoch (bef 1484–1497)
 John Iain Aluinn Macdonald, 4th of Keppoch (bef 1497-15??)
 Alexander Alastair nan Gleann Macdonald, 5th of Keppoch (bef 1484–1499)
 Donald "Glass" MacDonald, 6th of Keppoch (bef 1499-~1513)
 Ronald "Raonall MacDhonaill Ghlais" MacDonald, 7th of Keppoch (bef 1513–1547)
 Alexander Alastair Boloine MacDonald BT, 8th of Keppoch (bef 1547–1554)
 Ranald Og MacDonald BT, 9th of Keppoch (bef 1547–1587)
 Alexander Alastair nan Cleas MacDonald, 10th of Keppoch (aft 1547- aft 1640)
 Ranald Og Macdonald, 11th of Keppoch (bef 1593–1640)
 Donald "Glass" MacDonald, 12th of Keppoch (bef 1593-bef 1650)
 Alexander MacDonald, 13th of Keppoch (bef 1650–1663)
 Alexander Alastair Buidhe MacDonald, 14th of Keppoch (bef 1593–1669)
 Archibald MacDonald, 15th of Keppoch (aft 1663–1688)
 Coll MacDonald, 16th of Keppoch (bef 1688–1729)
 Alexander Macdonald, 17th of Keppoch (bef 1729–1746) (Killed at the Battle of Culloden)
 Angus MacDonald, (1725-1818) (ignored)
 Sir Ranald MacDonell, 18th of Keppoch (1736-1788)
 Sir Alexander MacDonell, 19th of Keppoch (1772-1808)
 Sir Richard MacDonell, 20th of Keppoch (1780-1819)
 Maj. Alexander MacDonell, (abt 1742–1820) (ignored)
 Sir Chichester MacDonell, 21st of Keppoch (bef 1819–1848)
 Angus MacDonell, 1st of Keppoch (1801-1855)

The current chief is Ranald Alasdair MacDonald, 22nd Chief of the Honorable Clan Ranald of Lochaber, who became chief in 2006 after the original line dead off with Angus MacDonell (1801-1855), who produced no heirs to the clan in the 19th century.

Clan Castle

The seat of the chief of the Clan MacDonald of Keppoch was originally at Castle Keppoch which was near to Spean Bridge in Lochaber. In 1690 it passed to the Mackintoshes. The lands were then disputed with the Mackintoshes, with the last clan battle being fought here. The castle itself had been demolished in 1663 after the Keppoch murders. The present Keppoch House was built by the 18th chief of the MacDonells of Keppoch about 1760; The house itself currently occupies the site of an earlier Keppoch House built probably in the second half of the 17th century and burned by Government troops after the Battle of Culloden.

Clan profile 

 Clan chief: Traditionally the chiefs of Clan MacDonald of Keppoch have been styled as "Mac Mhic Raonuill". The current chief of the clan is Ranald Alasdair MacDonald of Keppoch, who is the 22nd Chief of the Honorable Clan Ranald of Lochaber. The current chief's sloinneadh or pedigree is Ragnhaill Alasdair 'ic Aonghus 'ic Chichester 'ic Alasdair 'ic Richard 'ic Alasdair 'ic Ragnhaill 'ic Aonghus 'ic Raonall 'ic Donald "Glass" 'ic Raonall Ghlais 'ic Donald "Glass" 'ic Alastair Boloine 'ic Raonall Og 'ic 'ic Alastair nan Gleann 'ic Iain Aluinn 'ic Donald 'ic Aonghas na Fearste 'ic Alistair Carrach 'ic Eoin 'ic Aonghais Og 'ic Aonghais Mhor 'ic Domhnaill 'ic Ragnhaill 'ic Somhairle.
 Chiefly arms: The current chief's coat of arms is blazoned: Quarterly, 1st, argent, a lion rampant gules, armed and langued Or; 2nd; Argent, a hand in armour fessways holding a cross-crosslet fitchee Gules; 3rd, Argent, a lymphad sails furled and oars in action sable, Flagged gules; 4th, Azure, a salmon naiant in fess proper. According to author Norman H. MacDonald, another variation of the chief's arms was blazoned as: Or, a lion rampant Gules, a canton Argent, charged with a dexter hand couped fessways proper holding a cross-crosslet, fitchy of the second.
 Clan member's crest badge: The crest badge is suitable for members of the Keppoch MacDonald clan to wear, which consists of the heraldic crest and slogan. The crest is: a golden eagle with outspread wings wearing a crown. The slogan within the crest badge is AIR MUIR'S AIR TIR, which translates from Scottish Gaelic as "By Sea By Land".
 Clan badge: The clan badge or plant badge attributed to the clan is common heather. This plant is attributed to the other Macdonald clans and some other associated clans such as Clan MacIntyre and the Macqueens of Skye.
 Pipe music: The bagpipe tune Spaidsearachd Alasdair Charraich (translation from Scottish Gaelic: "Alasdair Carrach’s March") is attributed to the clan. Other pipe tunes Ceapach na fasaich ("Keppoch in the Wilderness"), Latha na Maoile Ruadh ("The Day of Mulroy"), and An tarbh breac dearg (The Red Speckled Bull) is also ascribed to the clan. Another pipe tune that is associated with the clan is "MacDonald took the Brae on them", which was used shortly after their victory at the Battle of Mulroy.
 Gaelic name: Clann Dòmhnaill na Ceapaich, Clann Mhic Raghnaill na Ceapaich

Tartan
The MacDonald of Keppoch tartan colours are red, dark green, navy and sky blue.

The MacDonald of Keppoch tartan sett is said to have been copied from a plaid that was given to Prince Charles Edward Stuart. However, there is another tartan sett for which the same claim is made by the Clan Johnstone.

See also
 Sìleas na Ceapaich
 Ailean a' Ridse MacDhòmhnaill
 Ranald MacDonald (bishop)
 Allan MacDonald (poet)
 Macdonald, things named Macdonald on Wikipedia

References

External links
The Honourable Clan Ranald of Lochaber

 
Scottish clans
Gaels